R. Walker Barn is a historic barn located near Newark, New Castle County, Delaware.  It was built about 1835, and is a tri-level or double decker, frame structure on a stuccoed stone foundation with an original straw shed and bridge house. It has a two level shed-roofed addition and a gable-roofed, two level wing. It features a gable roof with a late-19th century louvered cupola.

It was added to the National Register of Historic Places in 1986.

References

Barns on the National Register of Historic Places in Delaware
Infrastructure completed in 1835
Buildings and structures in New Castle County, Delaware
National Register of Historic Places in New Castle County, Delaware